Daisy Aitkens (born 25 March 1986) is an English actress, screenwriter and director best known for her role as Lucy Chadwick in the television series Fear, Stress and Anger, and sketch characters in Watson and Oliver. She wrote and directed the 2015 film 96 Ways To Say I Love You.

Personal life
Aitkens was born in Sydney, Australia and grew up in London. She is the daughter of writer Michael Aitkens and studied drama at the London Academy of Music and Dramatic Art (LAMDA).

Filmmography

Acting
 Life As We Know It
 Wire in the Blood
 The Bill
 Casualty
 Doctors
 Fear, Stress and Anger
 Watson and Oliver
 Colin
 Dune Drifter

Screenwriter
 My Family
 Shelfstackers
 96 Ways To Say I Love You

Director
 96 Ways To Say I Love You
 You, Me and Him

References

External links
 Daisy Aitkens at the Internet Movie Database
 Daisy Aitkens at the BBC Press Office
 Daisy Aitkens at The British Comedy Guide
 96 Ways To Say I Love You at the Internet Movie Database

1986 births
21st-century English actresses
English television actresses
English film actresses
English film directors
English screenwriters
Living people